Ritero Xaperle Bax is the seventh album by the Slovak punk rock/comedy rock band Horkýže Slíže, released in October 2004.

Track list

Personnel
 Peter Hrivňák (Kuko) – vocals, bass guitar
 Mário Sabo (Sabotér) – guitar, backing vocals
 Juraj Štefánik (Doktor) – guitar, backing vocals
 Marek Viršík (Vandel) – drums, backing vocals

External links 
Horkýže Slíže official website

2004 albums
EMI Records albums
Horkýže Slíže albums